The 1973 FIBA Korać Cup was the second edition of FIBA's competition, running from 9 January to 27 March 1973. It was contested by 12 teams, four more than in the previous edition.

Birra Forst Cantù defeated Maes Pils in the final to become the competition's first Italian champion.

Season teams

Round of 12
The round of 12 were played with a round-robin system, in which every Two Game series (TGS) constituted as one game for the record.

Semi finals

|}

Finals

|}

References
Linguasport 1973 FIBA Korać Cup
1973 FIBA Korać Cup

FIBA Korać Cup
1973 in basketball